Fútbol Club Juárez is a football club based in Ciudad Juárez, Chihuahua, Mexico founded in 2015.

The club purchased the Liga MX franchise of Lobos BUAP in 2019 and did not inherit their records or statistics, only matches counted towards the relegation coefficient.

As of the end of the Apertura 2022 season, the club's first team had spent seven seasons in the first tier of Mexican football and eight seasons in the second tier. The table details their achievements in first-team competitions, and records their top goalscorer for each completed season.

Key

Key to league:
 Pos. = Final position
 Pl. = Played
 W = Games won
 D = Games drawn
 L = Games lost
 GF = Goals scored
 GA = Goals against
 Pts = Points

Key to rounds:
 C = Champion
 F = Final (Runner-up)
 SF = Semi-finals
 QF = Quarter-finals
 R16/R32 = Round of 16, round of 32, etc.
 RE = Playoff round for liguilla
 GS = Group stage
 W/O = Withdrawn from competition

Top scorers shown in italics with number of goals scored in bold  are players who were also top scorers in the Liga MX that season.

Seasons

References